The play-offs of the 2017 UEFA European Under-21 Championship qualifying competition involve the four runners-up with the best records among all nine groups in the qualifying group stage: Austria, Norway, Serbia, and Spain. The draw for the play-offs was held on 14 October 2016.

The play-offs are played in home-and-away two-legged format. The two play-off winners qualify for the final tournament.

Ranking of second-placed teams

To determine the four best second-placed teams from the qualifying group stage which advance to the play-offs, only the results of the second-placed teams against the first, third, fourth and fifth-placed teams in their group are taken into account, while results against the sixth-placed team (for groups with six teams) are not included. As a result, eight matches played by each second-placed team will count for the purposes of determining the ranking.

Matches
All times are CET (UTC+1).

|}

Serbia qualified for the final tournament.

Spain qualified for the final tournament.

References

External links
Fixtures at UEFA.com

Play-offs
UEFA European Under-21 Championship qualification play-offs